Digital Garbage is the tenth studio album by the alternative rock band Mudhoney. It was released on September 19, 2018. This is their seventh studio album release on Sub Pop.

Critical reception

Digital Garbage received generally positive reviews from most music critics. At Metacritic, they assign a "weighted average" score out of 100 to reviews and ratings from mainstream critics, and the album received a Metascore of 75, based on 17 reviews. Allmusic's Mark Deming affirmed that "Digital Garbage isn't quite Mudhoney's great protest album, but as a reaction to a chaotic and divisive time, it's powerfully eloquent in its own grimy way, and it shows they can still sound like nothing but themselves without being tethered to the past. Come for the rage on Digital Garbage and stay for the rock. Both feel intense and purifying."

Allmusic chose it as one of their favorite rock albums of 2018, and Mojo listed it No. 55 on its list of top 75 albums of 2018.

Track listing
All tracks written by Mark Arm, Steve Turner, Dan Peters, and Guy Maddison.

Personnel

Mark Arm – vocals/guitar 
Steve Turner – guitar/vocals
Dan Peters – drums
Guy Maddison – bass

Charts

References

External links
 Digital Garbage on Subpop.com
 Mudhoney official website

Mudhoney albums
2018 albums
Sub Pop albums
Albums produced by Johnny Sangster